Il caso Mortara (The Mortara Case) is an opera in two acts composed by Francesco Cilluffo to an Italian-language libretto by the composer himself, inspired by The Kidnapping of Edgardo Mortara by David Kertzer. The opera was commissioned by the Dicapo Opera Theater, New York, and premiered in February 2010. It is the first Italian opera commissioned to an Italian composer by a New York opera company since the times of Giacomo Puccini at the Metropolitan Opera. New York Times critic Anthony Tommasini hailed it as one of the most important events of New York's 2010 operatic season.

Roles

References

2010 operas
Italian-language operas
Operas set in Italy
Operas based on real people
Operas set in the 19th century
Operas
Pope Pius IX